This is a list of nicknames of prime ministers of the United Kingdom. Since Sir Robert Walpole, most prime ministers have had a nickname which was in common usage at the time they were in office. Many nicknames can be perceived as disparaging although others are complimentary or affectionate.

List of nicknames

Robert Walpole
Sir Bluestring
Screen-Master General

Henry Pelham
King Henry the Ninth

Duke of Newcastle
Hubble-Bubble

Earl of Bute
Jack Boot

George Grenville
Gentle Shepherd

William Pitt the Elder
The Great Commoner, in reference to his continued refusal of a peerage whilst in office, though he later accepted the title Earl of Chatham.

Duke of Grafton
Royal Oak
The Turf Macaroni

Lord North
Boreas (the north wind)
Lord-deputy North

Earl of Shelburne
Malagrida
The Jesuit in Berkerly Square

William Pitt the Younger
Pitt the Younger, to distinguish him from his father, Pitt the Elder. 
Three-bottle man, in reference to his heavy consumption of port wine.

Henry Addington
The Doctor

Baron Grenville
Bogey

Spencer Perceval
Little P

George Canning
The Cicero of the British Senate
The Zany of Debate

Viscount Goderich
Prosperity Robinson
Goody Goderich
The Blubberer

Duke of Wellington

The Iron Duke

Robert Peel
Orange Peel, a reference to his views on Ireland.

Earl Russell
Finality Jack
The Widow's Mite

Earl of Derby
Scorpion Stanley
The Rupert of Debate

Earl of Aberdeen
Lord Haddo, in reference to Aberdeen's title before he assumed his grandfather's title of Earl of Aberdeen.

Lord Palmerston
Lord Cupid
Lord Pumicestone

Benjamin Disraeli
Dizzy

William Gladstone
Grand Old Man
The People's William
God's Only Mistake, used by Disraeli as a mocking alternative to Gladstone's preferred nickname (Grand Old Man).
Murderer of Gordon, a scathing inversion of Gladstone's preferred nickname (Grand Old Man) following the death of General Gordon at Khartoum. Gladstone had delayed sending Gordon military reinforcements, so was blamed for Gordon's subsequent defeat and execution by the Mahdists of the Sudan.

Earl of Rosebery
Puddin

Arthur Balfour
Pretty Fanny, a reference to his delicacy of appearance and manners.
Bloody Balfour
Tiger Lily
Miss Balfour

Henry Campbell-Bannerman
CB

H. H. Asquith
The Last of the Romans
The Sledgehammer
Squiffy

David Lloyd George
The Welsh Wizard
The Man Who Won The War
The Welsh Goat

Bonar Law
The Unknown Prime Minister

Stanley Baldwin
Honest Stan
Uncle Stanley, from his frequent use of the radio as Prime Minister.

Ramsay MacDonald
Ramsay Mac
Ramshackle Mac

Neville Chamberlain
The Coroner

Winston Churchill
Winnie
(British) Bulldog; first given to him by the Russians, it was a reference to his ferociousness and focus.
Former Naval Person and Naval Person; this was how Churchill signed many of his telegrams to US President Franklin D. Roosevelt, first choosing the code name "Naval Person" and later changing it to "Former Naval Person" after he became Prime Minister.

Clement Attlee
Clem
A sheep in sheep's clothing, an adaptation of wolf in sheep's clothing.

Anthony Eden
The Glamour Boy, in reference to his neat appearance.

Harold Macmillan
Supermac, originally coined by Victor Weisz as the title of an editorial cartoon published in the Evening Standard.
Mac the Knife, in reference to the Night of the Long Knives.

Alec Douglas-Home
Baillie Vass

Harold Wilson
Wislon

Edward Heath
Grocer Heath

James Callaghan
Big Jim
Sunny Jim, a homonym of "Sonny Jim", used to patronise an inexperienced person, and to refer to his optimism. Particularly used in the media during the Winter of Discontent of 1978–79, when Callaghan appeared out of touch with the problems people were facing at the time.
Uncle Jim

Margaret Thatcher
Attila the Hen, a pun on Attila the Hun
That Bloody Woman or TBW
Tina (There Is No Alternative), a reference to Thatcher's constant refrain that the market economy is the only system that works.
That Great Charmer, an anagram of Margaret Thatcher.
The Great She-Elephant, an allusion to Rudyard Kipling's Just So Stories.
The Grocer's Daughter, a double meaning in that she was literally the daughter of a grocer, but also the successor to Edward Heath, "The Grocer".
The Iron Lady 
Madame Frit, derived from her use of the dialect word frit in the House.
Maggie
Maggie the Great
Milk Snatcher, from mischief-making by a Labour Party conference speaker based on her failure as Secretary of State for Education to completely protect the school milk budget from a treasury raid. The compromise she managed to secure was that free milk at school was only abolished for older primary school children - free milk for secondary school children had already been abolished in 1968 by the Harold Wilson Labour government.
Mrs Finchley
Thatch, In the 1980s Ben Elton started a trend for referring to Mrs Thatcher as Thatch, a colloquialism for pubic hair.

John Major
Grey Man; Major "had been considered a decent but uninspiring person who was known as the 'grey man' of politics", with his caricature Spitting Image puppet portraying him as such.
Honest John
Prince of Greyness, again referencing his apparent dullness and lack of personality.

Tony Blair

Tony Blur, used during his time in opposition to describe his "clear image" but not what he stood for. 
Bambi, after the Disney character of a young deer; Blair had been the youngest prime minister for nearly 200 years.
Bliar, associated with the Iraq War. Blair was accused of misleading parliament and the country over weapons of mass destruction.
America's Poodle, a reference to his Special Relationship with the President of the United States, George W. Bush.
Teflon Tony
Tonibler, a Kosovan given name derived from Tony Blair due to his role in ending the Kosovo War, but also occasionally used as a nickname for Blair himself.

Gordon Brown
Flash Gordon, in reference to the comic strip hero Flash Gordon.
Big Clunking Fist, first used by Tony Blair during his final Queen's Speech debate, it was later used by columnists throughout the British media.
Great Clunking Fist, a common misquote.
Bottler Brown, used in relation to Brown not calling an election in 2007 after previously suggesting he would.
Golden Brown, as Chancellor, Brown sold 60% of the UK's gold reserves. Used by Terry Wogan and the TOGs, normally followed by Wogan saying "Never a frown with Golden Brown", a reference to the song "Golden Brown" by The Stranglers.
Gordo. The word means 'fat' in Spanish. 
Great Leader and Stalin, often sarcastically used by Andrew Neil on This Week in relation to Lord Turnbull's description of Brown as a man who operates with "Stalinist ruthlessness". The fortnightly satirical magazine Private Eye also had a mock Stalinist decree each issue, Prime Ministerial Decree.
Squatter in No. 10, used as Brown was not elected and after Brown attempted to form a coalition with the Liberal Democrats following the 2010 general election.

David Cameron
Dave, Cameron is reported to be known to friends and family as "Dave" rather than David, although he invariably uses the latter name in public.
DVD Dave, Cameron was reportedly known as DVD Dave because of his love of DVD Box Sets which he enjoyed with his wife Samantha.
Flashman, a reference to fictional upper-class bully Harry Flashman, used by Ed Miliband during a PMQs debate on reform to the NHS.
Call me Dave, used since the publishing of his 2015 biography Call Me Dave.
Hameron, in reference to the "Piggate" allegations.
Dodgy Dave, a nickname trending on social media with the #DodgyDave hashtag after Labour MP Dennis Skinner was sent out of the House of Commons in April 2016 for referring to Cameron as "Dodgy Dave" and repeating it after being instructed to withdraw it by Speaker John Bercow. This came about during the Panama Papers scandal.

Theresa May
Mummy/Mummy May, affectionately used by Conservative activists to make reference to her matriarchal powers, although she had no children.
Bloody Difficult Woman, originally used by Kenneth Clarke to describe May while preparing for an interview with Sky News, not realising he was being recorded.
Submarine May, originally used by Downing Street aides to describe May hiding away "like a submarine" during the EU referendum campaign.
Theresa Maybe, used to describe her apparent indecisiveness and vagueness, such as her use of the phrase 'Brexit means Brexit'.
Theresa the Appeaser, originally used to describe her relationship with U.S. President Donald Trump, particularly after Trump's signing of Executive Order 13769 known as the 'travel ban'. It has also been used since to describe her relationships with other world leaders.
Maybot, used to describe her 'robotic' nature, particularly during the 2017 general election campaign, from which she gained notoriety for frequently repeating campaign slogans such as "strong and stable leadership".
Teflon Theresa, used to describe her ability to avoid scandals whilst in the politically sensitive position of Home Secretary.
Lino, short for "Leader in name only", used during the Brexit process in reference to May's difficulty in passing her negotiated withdrawal agreement through the House of Commons and her perceived lack of authority as Prime Minister and Leader of the Conservative Party.

Boris Johnson
 Al, used by his friends and family as a shortening of his legal first name Alexander.
 Boris, Johnson has been described as one of the few politicians to be more commonly referred to by his given name than his last name.
 BoJo, a portmanteau of his forename and surname. Often used by the press internationally.
 BoJo the Clown, a pun on Bozo the Clown, a more pejorative form of the nickname "BoJo".
 BoZo, a pejorative variation of BoJo (see bozo).
 Bozza, an affectionate name used by his friends.
 Beano Boris or Boris the Menace, coined by the satirical magazine Private Eye which depicted Johnson as a blond-haired version of Dennis the Menace from The Beano.
British Trump or Britain Trump, used to refer to his perceived similarities with former US President Donald Trump.
 Buffoon Boris, a pejorative reference to Johnson's supposed ability to provide amusement through inappropriate appearance or behaviour.
 The Blonde Bombshell, a reference to Johnson's hair colour.
Greased piglet, a term used to describe him by David Cameron and subsequently by print media.

Liz Truss
 Liz, a shortening of Truss's middle name Elizabeth, this is a nickname Truss uses in an official capacity. Truss has been known by her middle name from an early age, rather than her forename Mary.
 Disruptor-in-Chief, a nickname coined by Truss herself in 2018, describing how she would work as Chief Secretary to the Treasury in tackling bureaucracy in the civil service. 
 Haggis Basher, a term used by her schoolmates, making fun of her Paisley Glaswegian accent after she moved from Scotland to England.
 Human hand grenade, supposedly coined by Dominic Cummings as "she does tend to blow things up".
 Queen of Instagram, a nickname used to describe her frequent use of social media, and particularly Instagram, in creating her public image. While international trade secretary, the department was nicknamed by her aides as the 'Department for Instagramming Truss'.
 Radon Liz, a nickname used by opponents to show her stiffness.
 The Iron Weathercock, a nickname believed to have been coined by French newspaper Les Echos'' in reference to her changing views on Brexit, like a weathercock turning with the wind.
 The Truss, a nickname Truss is reported to have used for herself.

Rishi Sunak
 Dishy Rishi, used to refer to his popularity in the early days of the COVID-19 pandemic, during his tenure as Chancellor of the Exchequer.
 Chatty Rat, a nickname originally used to refer to someone within Downing Street who had been leaking information to the tabloids during the premiership of Boris Johnson.
 Mr Tax, a pejorative nickname coined by Jonathan Ashworth while accusing him of "acting in his own interest" while Chancellor.
 Yorkshire Maharajah/Maharaja of the Yorkshire Dales, a nickname referring to Sunak's Indian heritage, his wealth, and his being an MP for Richmond, a parliamentary constituency in Yorkshire.

See also

List of nicknames of presidents of the United States
List of nicknames of prime ministers of Australia
Prime Minister parodies (Private Eye)

References

United Kingdom